Hierodula is a genus of praying mantids in the tribe Hierodulini, found throughout Asia. Many species are referred to by the common name giant Asian mantis because of their large size compared to other mantids. Their large size and vibrant coloration make Hierodula mantids popular in the pet trade. Some widespread species include H. membranacea and H. patellifera; however this has been considered a 'catch all' genus and is currently subject to review. In 2020, three species were moved to a new genus, Titanodula.

Species

Hierodula ansusana
Hierodula aruana
Hierodula assamensis
Hierodula atrocoxata
Hierodula beieri
Hierodula bhamoana
Hierodula biaka
Hierodula borneana
Hierodula brunnea
Hierodula chamoana
Hierodula chinensis
Hierodula coarctata
Hierodula confusa
Hierodula crassa
Hierodula cuchingina
Hierodula dolichoptera
Hierodula doveri
Hierodula dyaka
Hierodula everetti
Hierodula fumipennis
Hierodula fuscescens
Hierodula gigliotosi
Hierodula gracilicollis
Hierodula harpyia
Hierodula heinrichi
Hierodula inconspicua
Hierodula ingens
Hierodula italii
Hierodula jobina
Hierodula kapaurana
Hierodula laevicollis
Hierodula lamasonga
Hierodula latipennis
Hierodula longedentata
Hierodula macrodentata
Hierodula macrostigmata
Hierodula maculata
Hierodula maculisternum
Hierodula major
Hierodula majuscula
Hierodula malaccana
Hierodula malaya
Hierodula membranacea (giant Asian mantis, Sri Lanka mantis, green mantis)
Hierodula microdon
Hierodula mindanensis
Hierodula modesta
Hierodula monochroa
Hierodula multispinulosa
Hierodula nicobarica
Hierodula obiensis
Hierodula obtusata
Hierodula oraea
Hierodula ovata
Hierodula papua
Hierodula parviceps
Hierodula patellifera (giant Asian mantis)
Hierodula perakana
Hierodula philippina
Hierodula pistillinota
Hierodula prosternalis
Hierodula pulchra
Hierodula pulchripes
Hierodula purpurescens
Hierodula pustulifera
Hierodula pygmaea
Hierodula quadridens
Hierodula quadripunctata
Hierodula quinquecallosa
Hierodula quinquepatellata
Hierodula rajah
Hierodula ralumina
Hierodula robusta
Hierodula rufomaculata
Hierodula rufopatellata
Hierodula salomonis (jade mantis)
Hierodula samangensis
Hierodula sarsinorum
Hierodula saussurei
Hierodula schultzei
Hierodula scutata
Hierodula simbangana
Hierodula similis
Hierodula siporana
Hierodula sorongana
Hierodula sternosticta
Hierodula stigmata
Hierodula striata
Hierodula striatipes
Hierodula szentivanyi
Hierodula tenuidentata
Hierodula tenuis
Hierodula timorensis
Hierodula togiana
Hierodula tonkinensis
Hierodula tornica
Hierodula transcaucasica
Hierodula trimacula
Hierodula unimaculata
Hierodula venosa
Hierodula ventralis
Hierodula versicolor
Hierodula vitreoides
Hierodula werneri
Hierodula westwoodi

See also
List of mantis species and genera

Picture

References

External links
Pictures on Up Close with Nature blog
 

 
Mantodea of Asia
Insects of Asia
Mantodea genera
Taxa named by Hermann Burmeister
Hierodulinae